Francium hydroxide is a hypothetical inorganic compound with a chemical formula FrOH. It is a hydroxide of francium.

It probably can be produced by reacting francium metal with water:

This reaction might be explosive, because this reaction is probably very exothermic, because of which water could suddenly start boiling violently, producing hot water vapor, and very flamable hydrogen gas is produced in the reaction as well, and hydrogen could ignite, causing fire and explosion.

Francium hydroxide's alkalinity is predicted to be stronger than caesium hydroxide.

References 

Francium compounds
Hydroxides
Hypothetical chemical compounds